Dong Bai (董白) may refer to:

 Dong Bai, (c.2nd century CE) granddaughter of the Eastern Han warlord Dong Zhuo
 Dong Xiaowan (1624–1651), Late Ming poet, courtesan and writer